This page indexes the individual year in hip hop music pages.

1970s
 1979 in hip hop music

1980s
 1980 in hip hop music
 1981 in hip hop music
 1982 in hip hop music
 1983 in hip hop music
 1984 in hip hop music
 1985 in hip hop music
 1986 in hip hop music
 1987 in hip hop music
 1988 in hip hop music
 1989 in hip hop music

1990s
 1990 in hip hop music
 1991 in hip hop music
 1992 in hip hop music
 1993 in hip hop music
 1994 in hip hop music
 1995 in hip hop music
 1996 in hip hop music
 1997 in hip hop music
 1998 in hip hop music
 1999 in hip hop music

2000s
 2000 in hip hop music
 2001 in hip hop music
 2002 in hip hop music
 2003 in hip hop music
 2004 in hip hop music
 2005 in hip hop music
 2006 in hip hop music
 2007 in hip hop music
 2008 in hip hop music
 2009 in hip hop music

2010s
 2010 in hip hop music
 2011 in hip hop music
 2012 in hip hop music
 2013 in hip hop music
 2014 in hip hop music
 2015 in hip hop music
 2016 in hip hop music
 2017 in hip hop music
 2018 in hip hop music
 2019 in hip hop music

2020s
 2020 in hip hop music
 2021 in hip hop music
 2022 in hip hop music
 2023 in hip hop music

Hip hop music by year